The Turkey national beach soccer team represents Turkey in international beach soccer competitions and is controlled by the TFF, the governing body for football in Turkey.

Results
2021 Euro Beach Soccer League

17 June 2021 	Turkey  	1–5	 Russia 
	
18 June 2021 	Spain  	5–3	 Turkey 	

19 June 2021 	Belarus  	8–2	 Turkey

9 September 2021 	Lithuania  	3–0	 Turkey 	

10 September 2021 	Turkey  	7–5	 Greece 	

11 September 2021 	Turkey  	9–2	 Kazakhstan

12 September 2021   Turkey 	3–4	 Estonia

Tournament Records

Beach Soccer World Cup

FIFA Beach Soccer World Cup Qualification (UEFA)

Euro Beach Soccer Cup

Euro Beach Soccer League
Euro Beach Soccer League

Pro Beach Soccer Tour
Pro Beach Soccer Tour

Beach Soccer Intercontinental Cup

BSWW Mundialito

European Games

Mediterranean Beach Games

Current squad
As of 26 August 2021

References

External links
Turkey national beach soccer team at Turkish Football Federation

European national beach soccer teams
Beach soccer